The Progressive Club is a historic clubhouse located at Johns Island, Charleston County, South Carolina. It was built in 1963, and provided a home for Esau Jenkins' Progressive Club's legal and financial assistance program, adult education program, and dormitory lodging. It also served as a community recreational, child care, meeting place and grocery store. The building was built to house a "Citizenship School" where adult education classes and workshops enabled African-American citizens to register, vote, and become aware of the political processes of their communities. It was listed on the National Register of Historic Places in 2007.

Gallery of images

References

African-American history of South Carolina
Clubhouses on the National Register of Historic Places in South Carolina
Buildings and structures completed in 1963
Buildings and structures in Charleston County, South Carolina
National Register of Historic Places in Charleston County, South Carolina